Larroque-Toirac (Languedocien: La Ròca de Toirac) is a commune in the Lot department in south-western France.

Overlooked by a medieval castle, the village lies halfway between Figeac and Cajarc in the valley of the Lot.

The castle (Château de Larroque-Toirac) was built in the 12th century and improved over the following 300 years. It is now a popular tourist attraction.

See also
Communes of the Lot department

References

External links

Château de Larroque-Toirac

Larroquetoirac